Brenda Chapman (born November 1, 1962) is an American animator, screenwriter, storyboard artist, and director.  In 1998, she became the first woman to direct an animated feature from a major studio, DreamWorks Animation's The Prince of Egypt. In 2012, she co-directed the Disney/Pixar film Brave with Mark Andrews and Steve Purcell, becoming the first woman to win the Academy Award for Best Animated Feature.

Early life
Chapman was born in Beason, Illinois as the youngest of five. She went to Lincoln College in Lincoln, Illinois, receiving her Associate of Arts degree. She then moved to California and studied animation at the California Institute of the Arts (CalArts).

Career
During her summer breaks, Chapman began her professional career working in syndicated television animation. In 1987, she graduated with a BFA in character animation, and was hired as a story trainee on The Little Mermaid (1989). Chapman then worked as a storyboard artist on The Rescuers Down Under (1990) and Beauty and the Beast (1991), where she worked closely with Roger Allers to define many of the key sequences and motifs used in the film. She later served as head of story, the first woman to do so in an animated feature film, for The Lion King (1994).

Chapman joined DreamWorks Animation at its inception in the fall of 1994. Chapman was one of a team of three directors who worked on 1998's The Prince of Egypt, along with Steve Hickner and Simon Wells. She became the first female director for an animated feature by a major studio; three others had previously helmed independent efforts including Lotte Reiniger of The Adventures of Prince Achmed (1926), Joy Batchelor of Animal Farm (1954), and Arna Selznick of The Care Bears Movie (1985). She also worked on Chicken Run, and several projects in development while at DreamWorks before leaving the studio on maternity leave. In May 2003, Chapman and Allers were announced to direct Tam Lin, an adaptation of the Scottish folk ballad, for Sony Pictures Animation. 

However, later that same year, Chapman moved to Pixar after being invited by her old colleague Joe Ranft, where she had a brief stint on Cars (2006) before developing The Bear and the Bow, which was re-titled Brave (2012). In April 2008, Chapman was announced as the director of the film, making her Pixar's first female director. In October 2010, however, she was replaced by Mark Andrews following creative disagreements between her and John Lasseter. There were rumors that she subsequently left Pixar, but she remained on staff until shortly after the film's release. By July 2012, Chapman worked as a consultant at Lucasfilm Animation, helping to resolve story problems on Strange Magic (2015). When asked  whether she will return to Pixar, Chapman responded by saying she has no desire to go back there feeling that "[t]he atmosphere and the leadership doesn't fit well with me."

In 2013, she returned to DreamWorks Animation, where she helped in developing Rumblewick that had a strong female protagonist and was described as "funny with magic and heart." Chapman then left DreamWorks shortly afterwards. As of 2016, she began developing projects for Chapman Lima Productions, with her husband Kevin Lima.

In May 2016, it was reported that Chapman would make her live-action directorial debut with Come Away (2020), a fantasy drama that serves as a prequel to Alice in Wonderland and Peter Pan. In May 2018, it was reported that Angelina Jolie and David Oyelowo were portraying the parents of Alice and Peter, with both actors also serving as producers. Anna Chancellor and Clarke Peters joined the cast in August, with filming in London starting that same month.

In February 2020, it was reported that Chapman was attached to write and direct a live-action hybrid film adaptation of Ghost Squad. In December of that year, Chapman stated she had "kind of stepped away" from the  project, deciding instead to work on other projects with Lima. She also stated she was writing "a novel and thinking about turning it into an animated screenplay."

Personal life
Chapman is married to director Kevin Lima (A Goofy Movie, Tarzan, Enchanted), whom she met at California Institute of the Arts. They have a daughter, Emma Rose Lima, who was the inspiration for Mérida, Braves young princess. They reside in Tamalpais Valley, California. Chapman claims Scottish ancestry. In 2014, Chapman urged Scots to back independence in the September referendum.

Filmography

Feature films

Television

References

External links

1962 births
American animated film directors
American storyboard artists
American women film directors
American women screenwriters
Animation screenwriters
Animators from Illinois
Annie Award winners
California Institute of the Arts alumni
Directors of Best Animated Feature Academy Award winners
DreamWorks Animation people
Film directors from Illinois
Living people
Lucasfilm people
People from Logan County, Illinois
Pixar people
Screenwriters from Illinois
Walt Disney Animation Studios people
American women animators